The Duke Cancer Institute (DCI) is a National Cancer Institute-designated Comprehensive Cancer Center, research facility, and hospital.  Founded in 1971, the center is part of the Duke University School of Medicine and Duke University Health System located in Durham, North Carolina, United States.

The center specializes in the treatment and prevention of cancer and was ranked 41st in the U.S. News & World Report's 2021 list of top cancer hospitals. More than 10,000 new cancer patients are seen at Duke each year. The institutesinged the National Cancer Act of 1971 and became an NCI-designated cancer center in 1973.

In November 2010, Victor Dzau, MD, chancellor of health affairs for Duke University, formally unveiled the Duke Cancer Institute, during the topping out ceremony for the new building.

The DCI is a single entity—the first of its kind at Duke—that integrates and aligns patient care and basic and clinical research with the goals of improving patient outcomes, decreasing the burden of cancer and accelerating scientific progress.

Michael B. Kastan, a cancer scientist and Director of the Comprehensive Cancer Center at St. Jude Children’s Research Hospital, was named as the first Executive Director of the Duke Cancer Institute in May 2011. Eun-Sil Shelley Hwang became the institute's first female Chief of Breast Surgery.

On February 27, 2012, the Duke Cancer Institute opened the Duke Cancer Center, a new seven-floor building devoted exclusively to cancer care.

Clinical milestones 
In June 2018, the institute published a study in The New England Journal of Medicine showing how a genetically genetically modified poliovirus therapy improved long-term survival for patients with recurrent glioblastoma. Patients shoed a three-year survival rate of 21 percent.

References

External links 
Duke Cancer Institute Records at Duke University Medical Center Archives

Hospital buildings completed in 1971
Hospital buildings completed in 2012
1971 establishments in North Carolina
Hospitals established in 1971
Cancer organizations based in the United States
Medical research institutes in North Carolina
Hospitals in Durham, North Carolina
NCI-designated cancer centers